Joseph Chapman is an American film and television actor. He is known for playing the villainous character Mark St. Claire in the American soap opera television series Knots Landing. Chapman guest-starred in television programs including Airwolf, Riptide and Hill Street Blues. He also appeared in the 1984 film Crimes of Passion. Chapman starred in the television miniseries Favorite Son. His final credit was from the medical drama television series Providence.

References

External links 

Rotten Tomatoes profile

Living people
Place of birth missing (living people)
Year of birth missing (living people)
American male film actors
American male television actors
American male soap opera actors
20th-century American male actors